Stuart Patrick King (22 April 1906 – 28 February 1943) was an Australian sportsman who played first-class cricket for Victoria and Australian rules football for Victorian Football League club St Kilda.

Family
The son of David James King (1873-), and Emily Mary King, née Matthews, later Mrs. Edwards, Stuart Patrick King was born in Ararat, Victoria on 22 April 1906.

He married Kathleen Patricia Lightfoot (1911-) at Newman College's chapel on 14 January 1935. They had two children: Gerald and Diana.

Education
Educated at the University of Melbourne, he graduated Bachelor of Laws (LL.B.) in 1930, and was admitted to the bar on 1 May 1931.

Cricket
Born in Ararat, Victoria, King started his cricket career first, debuting for Victoria in the 1926/27 Sheffield Shield season, on 17 December 1926, at the Melbourne Cricket Ground, against Queensland. He was a right-handed wicket-keeper batsman and batted in the middle order. The last of his 12 first-class matches was played in 1932/33 and he finished with 417 runs at 27.80. His claim to fame as a cricketer was scoring seven of Victoria's world record 1107 runs against New South Wales in his debut summer.

Football
Having been recruited from the University Blacks, King played his first VFL match for St Kilda in 1931 and the following year was appointed club captain. When Charlie Hardy left the Saints seven games into the 1932 season he acted as a caretaker coach for the rest of the year. King played mostly as a defender and in his three seasons managed 43 games.

Military service

Already a well-established barrister and solicitor, King enlisted in the Royal Australian Air Force on 30 March 1942 as an intelligence officer, and was posted to 20 Squadron, gaining the rank of Flying Officer.

Death
He was killed as a result of a aircraft crash off the coast of Queensland on 28 February 1943. King wasn't a member of the crew - he went along as a 'supernumerary' person to observe the mission.

See also
 List of Australian rules football and cricket players
 List of Victoria first-class cricketers
 List of Victorian Football League players who died in active service

Footnotes

References
 World War II Service Record: Flying Officer Stuart Patrick King (255266), (Part One), National Archives of Australia.
  World War II Service Record: Flying Officer Stuart Patrick King (255266), (Part Two), National Archives of Australia.
 World War II Nominal Roll: Flying Officer Stuart Patrick King (255266).
 Roll of Honour: Flying Officer Stuart Patrick King (255266), Australian War Memorial.
 Commonwealth War Graves Commission: Flying Officer Stuart Patrick King (255266).
 McCrery, N., The Coming Storm: Test and First-Class Cricketers Killed in World War Two, Pen and Sword, (Barnesley), 2017.

External links

Cricinfo profile
Scorecard of World Record 1107 game
Project PRIAM: F/O Stuart Patrick King Profile

St Kilda Football Club coaches
1906 births
1943 deaths
Australian rules footballers from Victoria (Australia)
St Kilda Football Club players
University Blacks Football Club players
Australian cricketers
Victoria cricketers
Royal Australian Air Force officers
Royal Australian Air Force personnel of World War II
Australian military personnel killed in World War II
People from Ararat, Victoria
Cricketers from Victoria (Australia)